Ecopetrol, formerly known as Empresa Colombiana de Petróleos S.A. is the largest and primary petroleum company in Colombia. As a result of its continuous growth, Ecopetrol forms part of the Fortune Global 500 and was ranked 346. In the 2020 Forbes Global 2000, Ecopetrol was ranked as the 313th -largest public company in the world. It was ranked 303 in 2012 by CNN Money. The company belongs to the group of 25 largest petroleum companies in the world, and it is one of the four principal petroleum companies in Latin America.

Ecopetrol should not be confused with the US owned and operated Colombian Petroleum Co. (COLPET) and sister company South American Gulf Oil Co. (SAGOC), dating to the 1930s and taken over by the state owned Ecopetrol in the 1970s.

History 
The company arose from the assets reverted from the "Mares Concession", awarded by President Rafael Reyes to the Tropical Oil Company, which began operating in 1921 with the Infantas 2 well and the subsequent start of production of the field Cira-Infantas in the Middle Magdalena Valley (VMM). Even though there were attempts as early as 1941 for the Colombian government to legally take over the Tropical Oil Co., it was not until the expiration of the Concesión De Mares contract that a transfer of ownership would take place.

The reversion of "De Mares Concession" ("Concesión De Mares") to the Colombian State on 25 August 1951 gave way to the Empresa Colombiana de Petróleos, which had been created in 1948 by means of Law 165 of that year. The growing company assumed the reverted assets of the Tropical Oil Co. that began oil activities in 1921 in Colombia with the implementation of the Cira-Infantas Field in the Middle Magdalena River Valley. Ecopetrol undertook activities in the oil chain as a state-owned industrial and commercial company in charge of administrating the nation's hydrocarbon resources, and grew as other concessions reverted and became part of its operation.

The nationalization of Ecopetrol was not smooth and met with some opposition and skepticism as to how the company could in fact be able to keep up with the complex and expensive operations without outside expertise in the changing international market. A call for nationalization was nevertheless made.

In 1961, it assumed the direct management of the Barrancabermeja Refinery. Thirteen years later, it purchased the Cartagena Refinery, built by Intercol in 1956. In 1970, the company adopted its first by-laws, which ratified its nature as a state-owned commercial and industrial company, linked to the Ministry of Mines and Energy and fiscally supervised by the General Controllership of the Republic of Colombia. In September 1983, the discovery of the giant Caño Limón Field was announced. Thanks to this field, the company began a new era and in the year 1986, Colombia began to export oil again. During the 1990s, Colombia extended its oil self-sufficiency with the discovery of the giant Cusiana and Cupiagua Fields in the foothills of the Eastern Ranges of the Colombian Andes, bordering the Llanos Orientales. The fields were operated by British Petroleum.

In 2003, the Colombian government restructured the Empresa Colombiana de Petróleos, in order to internationalize it and make the company more competitive in the framework of the global hydrocarbon industry. Decree 1760, dated 26 June 2003 modified the organic structure of the Empresa Colombiana de Petróleos and made it Ecopetrol S.A., a public stock-holding corporation, one hundred percent state-owned, associated with the Ministry of Mines and Energy, and governed by its by-laws contained in Notarized Document No. 2931, dated 7 July 2003, issued by the Second Notary Public of the Bogotá D.C. Circle. The transformation released the company from State functions as the administrator of the oil source and the ANH (Agencia Nacional de Hidrocarburos) or in English, the National Hydrocarbon Agency, was created to carry out the function.

As of 2003, Ecopetrol S.A. began an era in which, with more autonomy, it accelerated its exploratory activities, its capacity to obtain results with a business and commercial vision and the interest in improving its competitiveness on the world oil market. Internationally the company operates also in the Gulf of Mexico, from Houston, Texas, the Mexican Gulf of Mexico offshore Veracruz, Tabasco and Campeche, and in the Brazilian offshore, with offices based in Rio de Janeiro, Brazil.

Capitalization 
The presidential signature in the law 1118 of 27 December 2006 was given after Colombian Congress' two houses approved in the night of Dec. 13 the bill of law in a session that extended for near eight hours. The initiative fixed limits for the participation of those who aspire to have shares of the company. Individuals who want to take part in the process will be able to acquire shares maximum up to five thousand legal monthly minimum wages, or about 2 billion Colombian pesos (some US$904,000). Whereas, no one private company will be permitted to own more than 3 percent of the Ecopetrol shares put out for sale, and pension funds, mutual funds and pension autonomous' Ecopetrol funds not be able to acquire any more than 15 percent, during the first two rounds. After the Congress approval, the Acting President of Ecopetrol, Mauricio Salgar Hurtado, declared himself satisfied by the approval of the initiative which, as he said, "clears the future of the company".

Now Ecopetrol will be able to tackle an ambitious plan of investments estimated in 12.5 billion dollars for the next five years. Behind that, it will be possible to advance in the internationalization plan of the company and to execute projects of modernization of the refineries and of improvement of the quality of the fuels. The company will be able to penetrate into the research, development and marketing of clean-energy technology and into the biofuels market. Finally, Ecopetrol will not be forced anymore to assume fiscal charges different from the derivatives of its corporate purpose.

To guarantee the democratization of the company, the placement of stocks will include three rounds. Both first ones will be directed to the Colombian solidary sector, that is to say, the pension funds, cooperatives, workers and pensioned of Ecopetrol, territorial entities and the Colombians in general. The remaining stocks will be offered to the public and other companies. The Colombian Government will assure a budget of investment for the years 2007 and 2008 not lower than for 2006 (US$1.4 billion) fitted by the growth of the GDP.

Once Ecopetrol becomes a mixed stock-holding corporation (80 percent governmental and 20 percent private), it will continue to be directed by the Stockholders General Assembly, the Board of Directors and the President of Society. The Colombian departments (provinces) in which Ecopetrol extracts hydrocarbons will have a seat in the Board of Directors. The selection of this representative must be established in the by-laws of the company. The next step is the selection of the investment banks which will valorize the company. The first round of stocks placement for Ecopetrol started on 27 August 2007.

In Nov. 2007, Ecopetrol held an initial public offering on the Colombian Stock Exchange (BVC), which raised $5.7 trillion Colombian Pesos (US$2.8 billion) from the sale of a 10.1 percent stake. On 18 September 2008 Ecopetrol announced the listing of its American Depositary Shares (ADSs) on the New York Stock Exchange (NYSE). Each ADS represents 20 ordinary shares of Ecopetrol common stock. The ADSs began trading that day on the NYSE under the ticker symbol "EC". JPMorgan Chase Bank, N.A. is acting as depositary for the ADS program and LaBranche & Co Inc. serves as the specialist for trading the ADSs.

In July 2008, a Latin American investment advisor, the Compass Group, stated that Colombia has an industry growth in many areas including energy, agriculture, technology, infrastructure and manufactured products. In addition to GDP growth and investment climate, Colombia has commodities growth. Ecopetrol is a major part of that commodities growth, as it has $60 billion to invest in oil development.

Corporate accountability 
Workers’ Rights, Violence and Impunity in Colombia
This document discusses the 2004 strike at Ecopetrol and the International Labour Organization's (ILO) address to review this strike. The ILO states that the strike could not have been declared illegal on substantive and procedural grounds and that the government should respect the order of the arbitral tribunal regarding the reinstatement of the workers.

Development, Peace and Human Rights in Colombia: A Business Agenda
This document addresses the development of the first Peace Laboratory. It mentions that the Fundación Ideas para la Paz has joined together with Ecopetrol to test the Conflict Sensitive business practice tool risk analysis and management methodology.

Ecopetrol and OXY attack the village population of the Centro - Barrancabermeja, Colombia 
According to Ecopetrol, they have created a National Commission and regional sub committees on Human Rights and Peace with the Unión Sindical Obrera (Worker's Union). Their activities have trained workers in peaceful coexistence and conflict resolution, leading to an increasingly effective resolution of cases presented to the committee. In 2006, Ecopetrol completed 35 activities to promote their human rights participation. Such activities included: 10 regional workshops on human rights and peace training, 2 workshops for basic human rights training, 5 regional (and 1 national) assemblies for employees and peace workers, 1 permanent assembly of the Civil Society for peace, 13 meetings of the National Commission for Human Rights and Peace, 2 sub committee members for Human Rights and Peace training, and 1 diploma course in human rights.

A Laboratory of War: Repression and Violence in Arauca
This document discusses Occidental's human rights violations, including the XVIII Brigade which is reportedly funded by Oxy that has collided with paramilitary forces and alleged monetary donations to other armed forces.

Structural changes for better socioenvironmental protection
A comparison of the structural changes that occurred because of Ecopetrol.

Special Issues and Campaigns: World Report 1999 
Human Rights Watch claims that Ecopetrol along with Occidental Petroleum and Royal Dutch/Shell, took no action to address reports of extrajudicial executions and a massacre committed by the state forces assigned to protect the consortium's facilities. The companies’ response was that human rights violations were the responsibility of governments, and they did not announce any programs to ensure that their security providers do not commit human rights violations.

Ecopetrol and the U'Wa 
In response to Ecopetrol's 2008 listing on the New York Stock Exchange, the environmental organization Amazon Watch issued a press release over concerns about Ecopetrol's inadequate commitment to corporate social responsibility and mishandling of controversial projects within indigenous reserves, specifically dealing with the U'Wa indigenous people of eastern Colombia. The group also wrote a letter to JPMorgan Chase, detailing discrepancies between Ecopetrol's current plans and activities and claims the company made in its statement to the Securities and Exchange Commission (SEC)  about its operations in indigenous reserves.

See also 

 Transandino pipeline

References

External links 
 Ecopetrol Official Site in English
 Financial Site of the Colombian Stock Market. Information about the EC stock in Spanish

Companies listed on the New York Stock Exchange
Oil and gas companies of Colombia
Colombia
Government-owned companies of Colombia
Multinational companies headquartered in Colombia
Companies based in Bogotá
Companies listed on the Colombia Stock Exchange
Non-renewable resource companies established in 1921
Automotive fuel retailers
Colombian brands
Energy companies established in 1921